Purno Agitok Sangma (1 September 1947 – 4 March 2016) was an Indian politician who served as the Chief Minister of Meghalaya from 1988 to 1990 and Speaker of the Lok Sabha from 1996 to 1998. He was the candidate for the 2012 Indian presidential election, supported by BJP and AIADMK, however he lost to Congress politician Shri Pranab Mukherjee. He was awarded the Padma Vibhushan, India's second highest civilian award, posthumously in 2017 in the field of Public Affairs and was the first recipient of Padma Vibhushan from Meghalaya.

Career
In 1973, Sangma became Vice-President of the Pradesh Youth Congress in Meghalaya and became the General Secretary of the party in 1975. He served in that position from 1975 to 1980.

In 1977, he was elected to the 6th Lok Sabha from Tura constituency in Meghalaya and represented the same constituency multiple times, from 1977-1988, 1991-2008, 2014-2016. The breaks in 1988 and 2008 were caused by his return to Meghalaya state politics. He became Speaker of Lok Sabha in 1996.

Chief Minister of Meghalaya
He was the Chief Minister of Meghalaya from 1988 to 1990.

Formation of Nationalist Congress Party
Sangma was expelled from the Congress on 20 May 1999, along with Sharad Pawar and Tariq Anwar, for raising the banner of revolt against Sonia Gandhi over the fact that she was a foreign-born citizen. Sangma along with Pawar and Anwar wanted a native-born citizen to be projected as the Prime Ministerial candidate. After his departure from the Congress Party, he was one of the founders of the Nationalist Congress Party (NCP) along with Sharad Pawar and Tariq Anwar in 1999. In January 2004, P.A. Sangma created a split in the NCP after Sharad Pawar became close to the NCP's former rival, Sonia Gandhi. After losing a battle for the NCP election symbol, Sangma later merged his faction with Mamata Banerjee's All India Trinamool Congress, forming the Nationalist Trinamool Congress.Sangma was one of two NTC MPs elected. He resigned from his Lok Sabha seat on 10 October 2005 as a member of AITC, and was re-elected as an NCP candidate in February 2006. He resigned from the 14th Lok Sabha for the second time in March 2008 to take part in the 2008 Meghalaya Legislative Assembly election.

On 5 January 2013, Sangma launched the National People's Party on the national level. The National People's Party managed to win two seats in the Meghalaya Legislative Assembly in the 2013 Meghalaya Legislative Assembly election. In 2014, Sangma was elected to Lok Sabha from Tura, and died mid-term in 2016.

Presidential election
Sangma's candidature was proposed by AIADMK and BJD, and later, supported by BJP as well. Sangma resigned from the NCP on 20 June 2012 after opposition from Sharad Pawar over his presidential candidature.  Former Union Minister and a Congress tribal leader Arvind Netam also came out strongly in favour of the candidature of Sangma for the presidential post.

On 22 July 2012, Pranab Mukherjee was declared the victor over P. A. Sangma, crossing the half-way mark of 525,140 votes after votes in half the states had been tallied. While securing the required quota, Mukherjee secured 558,194 votes to Sangma's 239,966. After the final results were published, Mukherjee secured 7,13,424 value of votes, while P. A. Sangma secured 3,17,032 values of votes. The Returning Officer for the Election, and the Secretary General of the Rajya Sabha, Vivek Agnihotri, then declared Mukherjee to be elected as President of India. Sangma subsequently accused the President-elect of graft.

Personal life
Sangma was born on 1 September 1947 in Chapahati, a village in the erstwhile Garo Hills district of Assam (in present-day West Garo Hills, Meghalaya), to Dipchon Ch. Marak and Chimri A. Sangma as one of their seven children. He lost his father when he was 11 and had to quit studies due to poverty. He was helped to return to school by a Salesian Father Giovanni Battista Busolin. Later, he obtained a Bachelor of Arts degree from St. Anthony's College in Shillong before shifting to Dibrugarh in Assam, where he taught in the Don Bosco High School while pursuing Master of Arts in international politics from Dibrugarh University.

Sangma married Soradini K. in 1973. They had two sons and two daughters together. Son Conrad was appointed as National President of Nationalist Youth Congress and daughter Agatha is a politician. Agatha was elected from Tura to the 15th Lok Sabha elections in 2009, and at 29, was the youngest minister in the UPA ministry.

Death

On the morning of 4 March 2016, Sangma died from cardiac arrest in New Delhi. He was aged 68.

Positions held

 1974 - Vice President of Meghalaya Pradesh Youth Congress
 1975 - The General Secretary of the Meghalaya Pradesh Congress Committee
 1977 - Member of Parliament, Tura constituency (1977 to 1988, first stint)
 1980 - Joint Secretary of the All India Congress Committee
 1980 - Deputy Minister in charge of Industry
 1982 - Deputy Minister, Ministry of Commerce
 1984 - Minister of State holding charge of Commerce and Supply
 1984 - Minister of State for Home Affairs
 1986 - Minister of State for Labour with Independent Charge
 1988 - Member, Meghalaya Legislative Assembly
 1988 - Chief Minister of Meghalaya
 1990 - Leader of Opposition, Meghalaya Legislative Assembly
 1991 - Re-elected, Member of Parliament, Tura constituency (1991-2008, second stint) 
 1991-93 - Union Minister of State, Coal (Independent Charge)
 1993-95 - Union Minister of State, Labour (Independent Charge)
 February–September 1995 - Union Minister of State, Labour
 1995-96 - Union Cabinet Minister of Information and Broadcasting
 1996 - Re-elected, Member of Parliament, Tura constituency
 1996-98 - Speaker of Lok Sabha -Chairman, (i) Business Advisory Committee; (ii) Rules Committee; (iii) General Purposes Committee; (iv) Standing Committee of the Conference of Presiding Officers of the Legislative Bodies in India; and (v) Institute of Constitutional and Parliamentary Studies;
President, (i) Indian Parliamentary Group, (ii) National Group of Inter-Parliamentary Union; and (iii) India Branch of the Commonwealth Parliamentary Association
 1998 - Re-elected, Member of Parliament, Tura constituency, as member of Congress
 1998 - Member, Committee on External Affairs and its Sub-Committee-I
 1998 - Vice-President, Indian Institute of Public Administration
 1998 - Member, Consultative Committee, Ministry of External Affairs
 1999 - Re-elected, Member of Parliament, Tura constituency, as member of NCP 
 1999 - Member, Committee on Labour and Welfare
 2000 - Member, National Commission to Review the Working of the Constitution
 2002 - Member, Committee on External Affairs
 2003 - Member, Committee on Home Affairs
 2004 - Re-elected, Member of Parliament, Tura constituency
 2004 - Member, Committee on External Affairs, Member, Committee on Private Members Bills and Resolutions, Member, Consultative Committee, Ministry of Home Affairs
 2006 - Re-elected to Lok Sabha as N.C.P. candidate on 23.2.2006, Tura constituency
 2008 - Member, Meghalaya Legislative Assembly
 2014 - Elected to Lok Sabha from Tura

See also
 Politics of India
 Nuclear disarmament

References

External links
 Biography - From Lok Sabha Speakers' official site
 P. A. Sangma: Fourteenth Lok Sabha Members Bioprofile
 XII LOK SABHA DEBATES - Sangma's famous debate against nuclear weapons
 Interview with Sangma by Rediff on NCP split up

|-

|-

|-

|-

|-

1947 births
2016 deaths
India MPs 1977–1979
India MPs 1980–1984
India MPs 1984–1989
India MPs 1991–1996
India MPs 1996–1997
India MPs 1998–1999
India MPs 1999–2004
India MPs 2004–2009
Chief Ministers of Meghalaya
Dibrugarh University alumni
Members of the Cabinet of India
Indian political party founders
Nationalist Congress Party politicians from Meghalaya
People from Tura, Meghalaya
Speakers of the Lok Sabha
Candidates for President of India
Lok Sabha members from Meghalaya
India MPs 2014–2019
Chief ministers from Indian National Congress
National People's Party (India) politicians
State cabinet ministers of Meghalaya
Meghalaya MLAs 1988–1993
Meghalaya politicians
Recipients of the Padma Vibhushan in public affairs
Ministers for Information and Broadcasting of India
Garo people